This is a list of artists who are, or have been, signed to MapleMusic Recordings.  Many of the acts no longer with the label are still distributed by Fontana North, a sister company and/or sold on MapleMusic.com.



#
22-20s
311

A
 Alabama Shakes
 Alberta Cross
 Trey Anastasio
 Ashes of Soma
 Autolux

B
 Jason Bajada
 Danny Barnes
 Rayland Baxter
 Beady Eye
 The Bees
 Belly
 Brendan Benson
 Ridley Bent
 Billy Talent
 Boots Electric
 Bo Keeney
 BOY
 Braided
 The Bright Light Social Hour
 Brighter Brightest
 The Bronx
 Jim Bryson & The Weakerthans
 John Butler Trio

C
 Candy Coated Killahz
 Carl Broemel
 DJ Champion
 Chantal Kreviazuk
 Codeine Velvet Club
 Cookie Duster
 Cowboy Junkies
 Crowded House

D
 Dala
 Dawes
 The Dears
 Delphic
 Mike Doughty
 Gordon Downie
 Drive-By Truckers

E
 Eastern Conference Champions
 Kathleen Edwards
 Peter Elkas
 Everest

F
 Fiction Family
 The Fireman
 Fitz and the Tantrums
 Mike Ford

G
 Gomez
 Grady
 David Gray

H
 Lisa Hannigan
 Hatcham Social
 The Henry Clay People
 Patterson Hood

J
 Colin James
 Jim James
 Carly Rae Jepsen
 Jem
 Sass Jordan
 Jovanotti

K
 Kill the Lights
 Patrick Krief
 Ben Kweller

L
 Land of Talk
 Daniel Lanois
 The Latency
 Bobby Long
 The Lowest of the Low
 Lucero

M
 Major Lazer
 Mariachi El Bronx
 Massari
 Danny Michel
 Miike Snow
 The Miniatures
 Minus the Bear
 Misstress Barbara
 My Morning Jacket

N
 Nash
 Sierra Noble
 Not by Choice
 Neverending White Lights

O
 Old Crow Medicine Show
 Organ Thieves
 Other Lives
 Ben Ottewell

P
 Doug Paisley
 Lesley Pike
 Pilot Speed (formerly Pilate)
 Joel Plaskett Emergency
 Jason Plumb
 Port O'Brien
 Prozzak
 Primus

R
 Radiohead
 The Rankin Family
 Sam Roberts
 Rodrigo y Gabriela
 Caitlin Rose
 Royal Wood
 Rusko

S
 Gordie Sampson
 Sea Wolf
 Silversun Pickups
 SOJA
 Theresa Sokyrka
 Spirit of the West
 Kinnie Starr
 Allen Stone

T
 Tegan and Sara
 Two Gallants

U
 David Usher

W
 Martha Wainwright
 The Whigs
 White Rabbits
 Widespread Panic
 Simon Wilcox

See also
 MapleMusic Recordings

Notes

MapleMusic
MapleMusic Recordings
Canadian independent record labels